George W. Hall (born 1840) was an American businessman and politician who served as mayor of Seattle in the 1890s.

Biography
Born in Jackson County, West Virginia (then Virginia) in 1840, he was the son of William Hall, a native of Ohio, and Mary (Cohen) Hall. He was educated in Virginia, and apprenticed as a patternmaker. During his early 20s he traveled through several western states and territories and worked as miner. He moved to Seattle in 1869, and during his career, Hall operated at various times a construction business, a furniture making company, a real estate development office, and other ventures.

A Republican, Hall served several terms on the city council. He served as Mayor of Seattle from 1891 until 1892. Hall was appointed on December 9, 1891, following the resignation of Harry White. On March 18, 1892, James T. Ronald was elected as his replacement.

Family
In 1872, Hall married Mary Virginia Bell, the daughter of William Nathaniel Bell, one of Seattle's founders. Their children included Edna, Ivy, Olive, and Aidine.

See also

 List of mayors of Seattle

References

Sources

Books

1840 births
Year of death missing
Place of birth missing
Place of death missing
19th-century American politicians
Mayors of Seattle